Ptychosalpinx is a genus of sea snails, marine gastropod mollusks in the superfamily Buccinoidea. Some sources place it in the family Buccinidae, the true whelks.

Species
Species within the genus Ptychosalpinx include:
 Ptychosalpinx altilis † (Conrad, 1832)
 Ptychosalpinx globulus (Dall, 1889)

References

External links

Buccinoidea
Gastropod genera